Walraven is a Dutch given name and patronymic surname. The given name is first attested in 1294 and has the Germanic roots *wald- ("ruler") and *χraban- ("raven"). The German equivalent of the name is Walram. Variants are Walrave and Walravens. People with this name include:

As a given name
Walraven I van Brederode (c.1370–1417), Dutch nobility, Stadtholder of Holland 1416–1417
 (1393–1456), Dutch Roman Catholic bishop
Walraven II van Brederode (1462–1531), Dutch nobility, council of Maximilian of Austria
Walraven III van Brederode (1547–1614), Dutch noble and ambassador
 (1776–1845), Dutch mayor of Utrecht
Walraven van Hall (1906–1945), Dutch banker and World War II resistance leader

As a surname
Walraven
Isaac Walraven (1686–1765, Dutch painter, engraver and jeweler
Jean Walraven (1926–2014), American hurdler
Jeanne Beijerman-Walraven (1878–1969), Dutch composer
Jook Walraven (born 1947), Dutch experimental physicist
Sharon Walraven (born 1970), Dutch wheelchair tennis player
 (1887–1943), Dutch writer and journalist

Walrave
 (born 1939), Dutch track cycle motor pacer

Walravens
 (1841–1915), Belgian Roman Catholic bishop
Hartmut Walravens (born 1944), German librarian
Jean-Paul Walravens (born 1942), Belgian cartoonist, animator and film director known as "Picha"

See also
1946 Walraven, main belt asteroid named after Dutch astronomer Theodore Fjeda Walraven (1916–2008)

References

Dutch masculine given names
Dutch-language surnames
Patronymic surnames